Felice Centini (1562–1641) was a Roman Catholic cardinal.

Biography
On 2 Oct 1611, he was consecrated bishop by Pope Paul V with Giovanni Garzia Mellini, Cardinal-Priest of Santi Quattro Coronati, and Michelangelo Tonti, Bishop of Cesena, serving as co-consecrators.

Episcopal succession

References

1562 births
1641 deaths
17th-century Italian cardinals